Kamran Tariq Mahmood (born 20 January 1993) is a Danish cricketer.  Mahmood is a right-handed batsman who bowls right-arm fast-medium.  He was born at Århus, Århus County.

Having represented Denmark at Under-19 level, Mahmood made his full debut for Denmark in the 2011 Nordic Cup against Finland, before playing in the European T20 Championship Division One which was held in Jersey and Guernsey.

In March 2012, Denmark took part in the World Twenty20 Qualifier in the United Arab Emirates, having qualified for the event by winning the European T20 Championship.  Mahmood was selected in Denmark's fourteen man squad for the qualifier, making his Twenty20 debut against Bermuda at the Sharjah Cricket Association Stadium.  He made six further appearances during the competition, the last of which came against Hong Kong, with him scoring a total of 53 runs in the tournament at an average of 10.60, with a high score of 25 not out.

His older brother, Rizwan, also plays for Denmark.

References

External links
Kamran Mahmood at ESPNcricinfo
Kamran Mahmood at CricketArchive

1993 births
Living people
Sportspeople from Aarhus
Danish cricketers